Lisa Stephens Neubauer ( Lisa Stephens; born July 21, 1957) is an American lawyer and judge, currently serving as a judge of the Wisconsin Court of Appeals in the Waukesha-based District II.  Judge Neubauer has served on the Court of Appeals since 2007 and was chief judge from 2015 through 2021.

Early life and education 
Neubauer graduated from the University of Wisconsin in 1979.  Prior to attending law school, she worked as an aide to state senator Fred Risser of Madison.  In 1987, Neubauer graduated from the University of Chicago Law School where she was a member of the Order of the Coif.  Following her graduation from law school, she was a law clerk to Judge Barbara Brandriff Crabb of the United States District Court for the Western District of Wisconsin.

Community involvement 
Neubauer is a recipient of the Community Service Award from the Association for Women Lawyers. She is a former board member of the Wisconsin Equal Justice Fund, Racine Area United Way, the Equal Justice Coalition, and Legal Action of Wisconsin. She has been a reading tutor in the Racine public elementary schools through the United Way Schools of Hope program, a big sister with a Big Sisters of Greater Racine, and a mentor for breast cancer survivors through "After Breast Cancer Diagnosis" (ABCD).

Neubauer is on the Supreme Court Finance Committee and is co-chair of the Wisconsin Bar Association’s Bench and Bar Committee and Chair of the Bench/Bar Court Funding Subcommittee. She previously served on the Planning and Policy Advisory Committee, the Judicial Conduct Advisory Committee, and the Wisconsin Supreme Court Committee on Community Outreach.

Legal career 
Neubauer was employed from 1988 until 2007 at the Milwaukee law firm Foley and Lardner, specializing in environmental cleanup litigation and rising to the level of partner. While at the firm, she chaired the Insurance Dispute Resolution Practice Group and co-chaired the firm's national recruiting committee.

In December 2007, Democratic Governor Jim Doyle appointed Neubauer to a seat on the Wisconsin Court of Appeals vacated by retired Judge Neal Nettesheim.  Neubauer was the first woman to serve as a judge of the court's District II, headquartered in Waukesha.  Neubauer was elected to a full term on the court in the April 2008 general election, defeating attorney William C. Gleisner III. She enjoyed bi-partisan support in her campaign for the position, including the endorsement of Michael Grebe, the former state chair of the Republican Party of Wisconsin. In 2009, Neubauer was appointed presiding judge of District II.

On May 8, 2015, the Wisconsin Supreme Court appointed Neubauer chief judge of the Court of Appeals. Neubauer took office on August 2, replacing retiring Chief Judge Richard S. Brown.

Neubauer was a candidate for Wisconsin Supreme Court in 2019.  Despite endorsements from 150 current and former Wisconsin judges, including 18 from the court of appeals, she was narrowly defeated by Judge Brian Hagedorn.

Neubauer was re-elected to another term on the Court of Appeals in 2020. On June 28, 2021, the Wisconsin Supreme Court issued an order ending her term as chief judge on July 31, 2021; she will be replaced by presiding judge William W. Brash III.

Personal life 
Lisa Stephens took the last name Neubauer in 1986 when she married Jeffrey A. Neubauer, who was then serving as a state representative and would later serve four years as chairman of the Democratic Party of Wisconsin.  They have three adult children, including Greta Neubauer, the current Democratic minority leader in the Wisconsin State Assembly.  The Neubauers reside in Racine, Wisconsin.

Electoral history

Wisconsin Court of Appeals (2008, 2014)

| colspan="6" style="text-align:center;background-color: #e9e9e9;"| General Election, April 1, 2008

| colspan="6" style="text-align:center;background-color: #e9e9e9;"| General Election, April 1, 2014

Wisconsin Supreme Court (2019)

| colspan="6" style="text-align:center;background-color: #e9e9e9;"| General Election, April 2, 2019

Wisconsin Court of Appeals (2020)

| colspan="6" style="text-align:center;background-color: #e9e9e9;"| General Election, April 7, 2020

References

External links
 
 
 Neubauer, Lisa at Our Campaigns

1957 births
Living people
20th-century American lawyers
21st-century American judges
University of Wisconsin–Madison alumni
University of Chicago Law School alumni
Wisconsin Court of Appeals judges
Wisconsin lawyers
20th-century American women lawyers
21st-century American women judges